The Hospital Creek Massacre refers to a retaliatory mass-slaughter of Indigenous Australians in 1859 in rural New South Wales. There are differing accounts of this event, but one alleges that a white stockman at Walcha Hut (now called Brewarrina), abducted an Aboriginal woman. The stockman was warned by the woman's fellow tribe members to release her. When the stockman refused to release the woman, they were both killed. White settlers retaliated by shooting a large number of Aboriginal men, women and children. Another version claims that the Hospital Creek Massacre refers to the death of 300 Aboriginals in retaliation for having "annoyed" white settlers.

Both of these versions are attempts at justification.  In 1928, The Sydney Mail published an article titled Pioneers of the West: The Massacre at Hospital Creek, written by G. M. Smith.  This article is cited in the references (2), however the true account contained in that article is not.

Smith claimed to have met a cattleman named Con Bride near Brewarrina in the 1880s. Con Bride was managing the Quantambone cattle station in 1859.  He found that many of his cattle were being speared near the waterholes, and attempted to persuade the Aboriginals to move on.  They refused, so he sent to an adjoining cattle station for assistance.  They sent men and ammunition, and Con Bride led a force of 20 armed men to disperse the Aboriginals.  He claims to have only shot a "dozen or so", however it is likely that it was many more, as many as 400.  He was quoted as saying "Some went so far as to say that I should have been put on trial for what I did, but the Government was well aware of the fact that the work we were doing outback could not be done with white-gloves on, and, therefore, were not too ready to take action in such cases, but depended on the humanity of the white settlers to spare the natives as much as possible." 

He described how the Aboriginals were hiding in the trees at the waterholes and spearing the cattle when they came to drink.

References 

Brewarrina, New South Wales
Far West (New South Wales)
1859 in Australia
Massacres in 1859
Massacres of Indigenous Australians
Murder in New South Wales